Đồng Nai Bridge is an important road bridge towards the south of the city of Biên Hòa in Vietnam. It is located along National Highway 1A, and crosses the river, connecting Bình Dương Province to Đồng Nai Province. The bridge has a length of 453.9 metres, and has 4 lanes, with a curb for pedestrians sides 3.6 metres wide.

The bridge was constructed in 1964, and it is now showing signs of degradation, although more than 44,000 vehicles pass over it per day. Currently, there is another bridge construction project underway in Đồng Nai with two parallel bridges intended to replace this ageing bridge. The new one was built and in use.

References

Road bridges in Vietnam
Buildings and structures in Đồng Nai province
Bien Hoa
Bridges completed in 1964